Edhem Mulabdić (19 October 1862 – 29 January 1954) was a Bosnian writer and co-founder of the political journal Behar.

Biography
Edhem Mulabdić was born in Maglaj in 1862, where he finished Islamic elementary school maktab and then got a job as a clerk. From Brčko he was transferred to Sarajevo, where he worked as a teacher at the Islamic school Dural-mualimmin. Soon he was elected as a national assembly in Maglaj. He stayed on that position until January 1929. Together with Safvet beg Bašagić and Osman Nuri Hadžić, Mulabdić would be one of the founders and originators of several welfare associations and publications, such as Behar in 1900 and Gajret in 1903.

His novel Zeleno busenje is regarded as the most significant work of this author, as well as the first Bosniak novel. Edhem Mulabdić's works would come to have a huge importance of the development of the Bosniak culture and education in late 19th and early 20th century.

Bibliography

Novels
Zeleno busenje, Matica hrvatska, Zagreb, 1898
Nova vremena, slika iz novijeg života u Bosni, Mostar, 1914
Kumovi
Garib
Nišan
Zekonja
Tajno pismo

Stories
Nesretan unuk
Đuro Prepelica
Aga i kmet
Lov
Tahiraga
Šehiti
Bajram
Kućni rahatluk
Uspomene u narodu

Others
Kod starog djeda
Osmanlija
Rukovjet šale, Sarajevo, 1893
Na obali Bosne (zbirka pripovijetki), Matica hrvatska, Zagreb
Crtice, Sarajevo, 1907
Izabrane pripovijesti, Matica hrvatska, Zagreb, 1944
Svak na posao, Sarajevo, 1934
Izabrana djela, Sarajevo, 1974

References

1862 births
1954 deaths
People from Maglaj
Bosniak writers
Bosniaks of Bosnia and Herzegovina